WHOI may refer to:

 Woods Hole Oceanographic Institution, a research and graduate degree educational institute in Massachusetts
 WHOI (TV), a television station (channel 24, virtual 19) licensed to Peoria, Illinois, United States